KPHR (106.3 FM, "Power 106.3") is a radio station licensed to Ortonville, Minnesota serving the Watertown, South Dakota area. The station airs a classic rock format and is owned by Prairie Winds Broadcasting, Inc. The station broadcasts using HD Radio. It carries a soft adult contemporary format on HD-2, known as Star 98.1.

Ownership
On August 3, 2007, KPHR was acquired by Armada Media as part of a 4 station purchase for a total price of $2.9 million.

On June 25, 2019, Armada Media sold KPHR, four sister stations, and a translator to Prairie Winds Broadcasting for a total price of $1.5 million  The sale was consummated on August 30, 2019.

References

External links
KPHR official website

Radio stations in Minnesota
Classic rock radio stations in the United States
Radio stations established in 1997